The Great American Beast (formerly known as The Red Affair) was an American Southern rock/metalcore band from Dayton, Ohio. The group disbanded in 2010 to focus on other pursuits.

History

Formation and early releases (2002-2007)
Formed in 2002 as The Red Affair, the band's original line-up consisted of several members from A Day in the Life, an alternative rock band from the same home city. The Red Affair went on hiatus a year later, and reformed in 2004 to record the EP Memento Mori. The Red Affair was featured on the three-way split EP with A Day in the Life and Hit the Lights entitled, From Ohio With Love.

After the departure of Justin Netherly, guitarist Levi Walden took over on vocals, with three other members (Peter, Ben, and Kipp) also joining the band. After five years of playing with The Red Affair, Levi left the band to start a family, and in late 2007 the band played their last show as The Red Affair, prior to changing their name to The Great American Beast.

Along with a new name, the band took on a new musical style. Previously The Red Affair was known as a softer band, representative of genres such as pop punk, emo, and post-hardcore. The Great American Beast, however, resembles modern metalcore and Southern rock.

Domestic Blood and break-up (2007-2010)
In late 2009 the band was signed with Trustkill Records. In September 2010 the group released their debut full-length album, entitled Domestic Blood. A digital EP entitled The Modern Gentlemen was released prior to the album, on June 22, 2010. Both works were released through Trustkill Records.

As of October 2010, bass guitarist Peter Disalvo announced via Myspace that the band had broken up and decided to "return to the real world."  A final show was performed on October, 23, 2010 at Sidney Elk's Lodge in Sidney, Ohio.

References

American southern rock musical groups
Metalcore musical groups from Ohio
American post-hardcore musical groups
Musical groups from Dayton, Ohio
Trustkill Records artists